Anna Plichta (born 10 February 1992) is a Polish former racing cyclist, who rode professionally between 2016 and 2021 for five different teams. She rode at the UCI Road World Championships every year between 2014 and 2020, and also represented Poland at the 2015 European Games in the women's road race and women's time trial.

Career
In September 2016 she was announced as part of the  squad for 2017. Plichta was meant to join Belgian team  in 2018, but the team was disbanded in late October 2017 when their title sponsor Lensworld's new parent company, LensOnline decided to not continue sponsorship of the cycling team.

Ahead of the 2021 season, Plichta joined the  team on a two-year contract, however she retired at the end of 2021.

Personal life
Her favourite place to ride is the Polish mountains.

Major results

2014
 4th GP du Canton d'Argovie
 10th Overall Internationale Thüringen Rundfahrt der Frauen
1st  Young rider classification
2015
 3rd Overall Tour de Feminin-O cenu Českého Švýcarska
 7th Overall Belgium Tour
 9th Overall Auensteiner–Radsporttage
2016
 2nd Road race, National Road Championships
 2nd Overall Tour de Feminin-O cenu Českého Švýcarska
 5th Overall Tour of Zhoushan Island
2017
 3rd Road race, National Road Championships
2019
 1st  Time trial, National Road Championships
 4th Overall Gracia–Orlová
 7th Overall Madrid Challenge by la Vuelta
2020
 1st  Time trial, National Road Championships
 7th Time trial, UEC European Road Championships

References

External links
 
 

1992 births
Living people
Polish female cyclists
People from Wadowice
Cyclists at the 2015 European Games
European Games competitors for Poland
Cyclists at the 2016 Summer Olympics
Cyclists at the 2020 Summer Olympics
Olympic cyclists of Poland
Sportspeople from Lesser Poland Voivodeship
21st-century Polish women